Kotomi Takahata may refer to:
 Kotomi Takahata (actress)
 Kotomi Takahata (tennis)